Contra Costa refers to Contra Costa County, California and many things within or adjacent to its borders, including:

Population centers 
Contra Costa Centre, California

Transit 
 Contra Costa (railroad ferryboat)
Pleasant Hill/Contra Costa Centre station
Alameda-Contra Costa Transit District
Eastern Contra Costa Transit Authority
Western Contra Costa Transit Authority

Water 
Contra Costa Canal
Contra Costa Water District

Schools 
Contra Costa Community College District
Contra Costa College
West Contra Costa Unified School District

Other governmental bodies 
Arts and Culture Commission of Contra Costa County
Contra Costa County Board of Supervisors
Contra Costa County Employees' Retirement Association
Contra Costa County Library
Contra Costa County Superior Court
Central Contra Costa Sanitary District
West Contra Costa County Detention Center

Newspaper 
Contra Costa Times

Related lists 
California Historical Landmarks in Contra Costa County
National Register of Historic Places listings in Contra Costa County, California